The Hohe Wand is a mountain ridge in Lower Austria and is part of the Gutenstein Alps. It lies west of Steinfeld in the Vienna Basin; its highest peak (the Plackles) attains a height of 1,132 m. It is one of Vienna's Hausberge.

General 
It derives its name, which means "High Wall", from the steep rock faces on its south and southeast side. The high plateau is about 8 km long and stretches from the area of the Plackles peak in the southwest to the so-called Wandeck in the northeast.

The plateau of the Hohe Wand may be accessed over a toll road built in 1931/32 that branches off the road between Stollhof and Maiersdorf. From 1965 until it was dismantled in 1994 there was also a double chairlift from Grünbach to the Plackles summit.
Easy, but little used, hiking trail runs from the Dürnbach valley, from Grünbach and from the "rear side", from Miesenbach, up the mountain. Most of the climbs on the southern and southeastern sides are more challenging, requiring sure-footedness and, in places a head for heights. In this area are most of the over 700 climbing routes of all levels of difficulty; there are also numerous Klettersteigs.

There are 225 caves in the area of the Hohe Wand. The Unicorn Cave near Dreistetten is accessible to the public as a show cave.

Due to its location on the edge of the Vienna Basin and its accessibility by car, there are 3 popular take-off points on the Hohe Wand for paragliders and hang gliders. The most popular of these is the eastern one, the Oststartplatz, the most challenging and the one most used by hang gliders is the southern one, the Südstartplatz; there is also the less used Almfrieden Startplatz. The Hohe Wand is especially suitable for flying due to its south-to-east wind situations and is also the local mountain for the Viennese.

On the plateau there is a large number of mountain inns and Alpine huts, but also numerous weekend houses, especially in Wanddörfl.

Part of the Hohe Wand has been placed under protection as the Hohe Wand Nature Park, but the name is used to market tourist attractions, some of which have been heavily criticised as being incompatible with a nature park (e.g. the "Skywalk" observation platform that juts out from the rocks).

Popular easy hiking routes 
The following paths and climbs are listed in order beginning from those southwest of the Hohe Wand (the southern end of the rock faces) then via the mainly eastwards oriented rock faces, the north and northwest and back to the southwest (i.e. anti-clockwise).

 Pfarrersteig
 Grafenbergweg
 Wagnersteig
 Springlessteig
 Leitergraben
 Straßenbahnerweg
 Krumme Ries (from Maiersdorf "Maier´s village")
 Völlerinsteig
 Leiterlsteig
 Drobilsteig
 Einhornhöhlenweg "Unicorn Cave - Route"
 Waldeggersteig (Große Klause)
 Krumme Ries (Kleine Klause)

Popular Klettersteige (Via ferrata) 

 Blutspur
 Drobilsteig
 Frauenluckensteig
 Ganghofersteig
 Hanselsteig
 HTL-Steig
 Kammerlingsteig
 Leiterlsteig
 Naturfreundesteig (Kleine Klause)
 Springlessteig
 Steirerspur
 Völlerinsteig
 Wagnersteig
 Währingersteig
 Waldeggersteig (Große Klause)
 Wildenauersteig

Popular climbing routes 

 Austriasteig
 A-Steig
 direct Sonnenuhrwand
 Draschgrat
 Fredsteig
 Freundschaftssteig
 Grafenbergsteig
 Kanzelsteig
 Postlgrat
 Reineke Fuchs
 Tirolersteig
 Totenköpflsteig
 Turmsteig
 Weningersteig
 Wienersteig

Popular Klettergärten (Climbing garden) 
 Almfriedenwände
 Baumgartnerturm
 Milak-Klettergarten
 obere und untere Naglplatte
 ÖTK-Klettergarten

Huts 

 Gasthaus auf dem Geländ (1023 m), formerly TVN, now private
 Berghaus Plackles (1132 m), private
 Wilhelm Eichert Hut (1052 m), ÖTK
 Turmsteig Hut (1000 m), privat
 Hubertushaus (946 m), ÖGV
 Hochkogelhaus (932 m), TVN
 Alpengasthof Postl (892 m), private
 Herrgottschnitzerhaus (826 m), formerly Alpine Gesellschaft „D'Herrgottschnitzer“ (Wien), now private
 Wiener Neustädter Haus (1035 m), formerly TVN, now private
 Kohlröserlhaus (900 m), private
 Stützpunkt der Berg- und Naturwacht
 Gasthof Jagasitz (Haslinger), closed
 Seiser Toni
 Klein-Kanzel-Haus (1092 m), private
 Sepp-Steinwender-Hut
 Dr.-Ferdinand-Nagl-Haus ÖTV
 Hohe-Wand-Naturfreundehaus (1050 m), TVN
 Scheimhut am Rastkreuzsattel, between Geländ and Hoher Wand.
 Waldegger Haus (1002 m)
 Turmsteighütte (1000 m), private
 Gasthaus Luf
 Kohlröserlhaus (900 m), privat
 Gasthaus Almfrieden
 Hanselsteighaus, closed
 Imbissstand near entry of Einhornhöhle "Unicorn Cave (Austria)|Unicorn Cave"

References

External links 

Hohe Wand Nature Park 
 Allerlei. Österreich. Eine Drahtseilbahn auf die Hohe Wand und auf den Schneeberg. Badener Zeitung, 2 April 1927, p. 5 

Gutenstein Alps
Mountains of the Alps
Landforms of Lower Austria
Ridges of Europe
One-thousanders of Austria